Kenny's World is an Australian television mockumentary on Network Ten that is a spin-off from the 2006 mockumentary film Kenny.

The series stars Shane Jacobson, reprising his role of Kenny Smyth, Australia's favourite portaloo plumber who scours the globe for bizarre, intriguing and often downright ridiculous examples of toilet technology. The show was canned after one season due to poor ratings and reception. Places Kenny travels to during the course of the series include the world's fastest Porta-loo in Indianapolis, Egypt's City of the Dead, and The World Toilet Summit and the Expo in India.

Episodes

References

Network 10 original programming
2008 Australian television series debuts
2008 Australian television series endings
Australian comedy television series
Australian mockumentary television series
Television shows set in Victoria (Australia)